Julie Gayet (born 3 June 1972) is a French actress and film producer. She is also known for being the wife of the former President of the French Republic, François Hollande.

Early life and education 
Gayet was born in Suresnes, Hauts-de-Seine, where her father Brice Gayet is a professor and head of gastric surgery at the Institut Mutualiste Montsouris. He was former head of the clinic to the Lariboisière Hospital and lecturer at the Faculty Xavier Bichat at Paris Diderot University. Her mother is an antique dealer. Her paternal grandfather, Alain Gayet, was also a surgeon and became a Compagnon de la Libération after World War II. She received a social liberal intellectual upbringing.

Gayet studied art history and psychology at university, circus skills at the circus school of the Fratellini family, and operatic singing under Tosca Marmor. At the age of 17, she studied at the Actors Studio in London with Jack Waltzer, and then continued at the Tania Balachova School in Paris.

Career

Acting 
Gayet made her acting debut in a 1992 episode of the French TV series Premiers baisers, and had her first film role as an extra in Three Colors: Blue (1993), but her first role of public note was in the 1996 comedy Delphine 1, Yvan 0 by Dominique Farrugia.

Singing 
Her musical performances include playing in video-clips for Benjamin Biolay and singing a duet with Marc Lavoine.

Film production 
In 2007, she founded her own production company, Rouge International, with Nadia Turincev and produced films such as The Ride by Stephanie Gillard, Fix me by Palestinian Raed Andonia and Bonsai by Cristian Jimenez of Chile.

Film directing 
In 2013, Gayet co-directed with Mathieu Busson the documentary Cinéast(e)s featuring 20 French female film directors.

Other 
Gayet appeared on the cover of the 17 January 2014 issue of the French Elle magazine. The issue hit newsstands on 15 January 2014, two days ahead of its usual release day. The headline read "Julie Gayet, Actress and Committed Woman, a French Passion".

Personal life 
In 2003, Gayet married author and screenwriter Santiago Amigorena, but they divorced in 2006. The couple have two children.

Gayet is a centre-left activist, having appeared in a video supporting François Hollande during the 2012 French presidential election. She is a member of the Support Committee of the PS candidate for the 2014 Paris mayoral election, Anne Hidalgo. She also supported same-sex marriage in France.

In 2013 rumours started circulating that Gayet was in a secret relationship with President Hollande.  On 10 January 2014, a story in the tabloid Closer featured seven pages of alleged revelations and photos about the affair, provoking wider media coverage.  Hollande said he "regretted this violation of his private life" and was "thinking about" pursuing a legal response, but did not deny the substance of the story. The 10 January issue was so popular that Closer "reprinted the issue, with a further 150,000 copies scheduled to hit newsstands" on 15 January 2014. On 16 January 2014, the AFP news agency reported that Gayet would sue Closer for €50,000 in damages and €4,000 in legal costs.

On 27 March 2014, a French court ordered Closer magazine to pay Gayet €15,000 ($20,700) for publishing the photos that revealed an affair between her and President Hollande. In November 2014, she was photographed with Hollande at the Élysée Palace gardens; it was revealed that her affair with Hollande was ongoing and that she was spending at least four nights a week with him there.

Gayet married former French President François Hollande on 4 June 2022 in Tulle, France.

In October 2022, she is appointed to the supervisory board of French professional rugby union club CA Brive.

Gayet is of French, as well distant Polish, German, Maltese, and Corsican Italian descent.

Awards 
 1997: Prix Romy Schneider for her role in Sélect Hôtel.
 1997: Best European Actress for Sélect Hôtel, Brussels International Film Festival.
 2009: Best Actress at the Tokyo International Film Festival for

Filmography

Film

Television

Short films

As director

As producer

Videoclips

Songs 
 Duet with Marc Lavoine on the song Avec toi from the album Je descends du singe (2012).

References

External links 

 
 Julie Gayet Filmography at Allocine.

1972 births
Living people
20th-century French actresses
21st-century French actresses
François Hollande
French film actresses
French film producers
French people of Breton descent
French people of Italian descent
French socialists
French television actresses
French women film directors
French women film producers
French LGBT rights activists
Spouses of national leaders
People from Suresnes